Interstate 69 (I-69) is a part of the Interstate Highway System that will eventually run from the Mexican border in Texas to the Canadian border at Port Huron, Michigan. In Michigan, it is a state trunkline highway that enters the state south of Coldwater and passes the cities of Lansing and Flint in the Lower Peninsula. A north–south freeway from the Indiana–Michigan border to the Lansing area, it changes direction to east–west after running concurrently with I-96. The freeway continues to Port Huron before terminating in the middle of the twin-span Blue Water Bridge while running concurrently with I-94 at the border. There are four related business loops for I-69 in the state, connecting the freeway to adjacent cities.

Predecessors to I-69 include the first M-29, US Highway 27 (US 27), M-78 and M-21. The freeway was not included on the original Interstate Highway System planning maps in the mid-1950s, but it was added in 1958 along a shorter route. Michigan built segments of freeway for the future Interstate in the 1960s, and the state was granted additional Interstate mileage in 1968 to extend I-69 north and east to Flint. Later extensions in 1973 and 1987 resulted in the modern highway. The first freeway segment designated as I-69 in Michigan opened in 1967, and the last was completed in 1992, finishing Michigan's Interstate System. US 27 previously ran concurrently with I-69 from the Indiana–Michigan state line north to the Lansing area, but this designation was removed in 2002.

Route description
The entirety of I-69 is listed on the National Highway System, which is a network of roadways important to the country's economy, defense, and mobility. The freeway carries 91,100 vehicles on average each day between I-475 and M-54 in Flint and 14,085 vehicles between M-53 and Capac Road near the Lapeer–St. Clair county line, the highest and lowest traffic counts in 2012, respectively. I-69 carries the Lake Huron Circle Tour in the Port Huron area and the I-69 Recreational Heritage Route from the Indiana state line north to the Calhoun–Eaton county line. I-69 is mostly a four-lane freeway in the state of Michigan, with exceptions in the Lansing and Flint metro areas where it is six lanes and in Port Huron where it is three lanes westbound and three lanes eastbound until eastbound traffic splits into six lanes of local traffic to Port Huron and two lanes to the Blue Water Bridge.

Northward to Lansing

I-69 in Michigan begins at the Indiana state line southeast of Kinderhook and just north of an interchange with the Indiana Toll Road, which carries I-80 and I-90. From there, I-69 runs northward through a mixture of Southern Michigan farmland and woodland in Branch County. A few miles north of the state line, the freeway passes Coldwater Lake State Park and its namesake body of water; north of the lake, there is a welcome center for the northbound lanes. I-69 curves around the east side of Coldwater, connecting to the city's business loop on the south of town. Immediately east of downtown, the freeway intersects the northern end of the business loop at an interchange that also features US 12 (Chicago Road). Farther north, the freeway turns to the northwest, crosses into Calhoun County and then over the St. Joseph River. I-69 turns back northward and bypasses Tekonsha to the town's west, intersecting M-60 in the process.

Curving around Nottawa Lake, I-69 continues northward through southern Calhoun County. It passes through an interchange that marks the southern terminus of M-227, a highway that connects northward into Marshall. The freeway crosses the Kalamazoo River and passes through an interchange with M-96 west of downtown Marshall. From that interchange northward, the BL I-94 designation is overlaid on I-69; the business loop ends at the cloverleaf interchange northwest of Marshall that marks the first of I-69's two junctions with I-94 in the state . North of I-94, I-69 has one more interchange at N Drive North before crossing into Eaton County.

In southern Eaton County, the freeway parallels the Battle Creek River north of the junction with M-78. Near Olivet, I-69 begins to turn in a northeasterly direction and curves around the north side of town. On the south side of Charlotte, I-69 turns northward, traversing an area to the east of downtown and crossing the former routing of US 27, which is now part of the business loop for the city. Farther north, the freeway has a junction with M-50, a bridge over the Battle Creek River, and an interchange with the northern end of the business loop next to Fitch H. Beach Airport. North of the airport, I-69 turns northeasterly again and parallels Lansing Road, the former route of US 27/M-78. The freeway meets the southern end of M-100 near Potterville and continues into the Lansing–East Lansing metropolitan area. Southwest of the state's capital city, I-69 crosses over Lansing Road near Lansing Delta Township Assembly, a factory for General Motors; northeast of the complex, I-69 merges into I-96. The combined I-96/I-69 runs northward through the suburban edges of the Lansing area, intersecting the western ends of I-496 and the BL I-69 for Lansing. The freeway enters Clinton County, and just north of a crossing of the Grand River, I-69 turns eastward to separate from I-96. As a part of the larger interchange with I-96, I-69 crosses BL I-96 (Grand River Avenue) without any connections.

Eastward to Port Huron
After leaving the I-96 concurrency, I-69 changes cardinal orientation and is signed as east–west from that point on. The freeway continues parallel to the Looking Glass River through suburban areas north of Capital Region International Airport. North of East Lansing, I-69 meets US 127 at a cloverleaf interchange. East of that junction, I-69 turns southeasterly passing the Hawk Hollow Golf Course and Park Lake on the way to meet the eastern end of BL I-69 just north of Lake Lansing. I-69 then turns northeasterly parallel to Lansing Road (Old M-78) to enter Shiawassee County. The freeway continues through Central Michigan farmlands, jogging north of Perry and Bancroft.

At Durand, I-69 meets the southeastern end of M-71 on the northwest side of town. The freeway turns sharply to the northeast before turning due east near Lennon. The interchange with M-13 south of Lennon marks the Shiawassee–Genesee county line. Continuing eastward, I-69 parallels Miller Road to the north as far as the city of Swartz Creek; east of town, the two roadways cross. I-69 parallels a line of the Canadian National Railway as it enters the Flint metro area. The freeway intersects Bristol Road near the Bishop International Airport and then crosses I-75/US 23 southwest of downtown Flint. I-69, the railroad and the Swartz Creek all parallel into downtown Flint where the freeway intersects I-475 and M-54 (Dort Highway) before exiting the east side of the city.

I-69 runs eastward out of Flint parallel to the railroad. At Davison, it intersects M-15 before crossing into Lapeer County. In this area, the freeway traverses farmlands in the southern part of the region called The Thumb. It jogs to the north around Lake Nepessing, which is southwest of Lapeer. The freeway continues through farmland to Imlay City, where it meets M-53 before crossing into western St. Clair County. I-69 continues eastward through an interchange with M-19 at Emmett.

Near Wadhams, I-69 curves around to the north to follow part of the Black River. On the east side of the community, the freeway turns back to the southeast as it enters the western edge of the Port Huron suburbs. I-69 turns again to run due eastward to intersect I-94. The two freeways merge in an interchange that also has connections to BL I-69. The freeway curves to the north and back around to the east to cross the Black River. On the eastern bank, I-94/I-69 travels through one more interchange, this one for M-25 and BL I-69/BL I-94. Past the interchange, the freeway crosses through the toll and customs plazas for the twin-span Blue Water Bridge. The I-69 designation officially ends at the international boundary in the middle of the St. Clair River where it connects with Highway 402.

History

Predecessor highways

The first major overland transportation corridors in the future state of Michigan were the Indian trails. None of these followed the path of the modern I-69 however.
The State Trunkline Highway System was created on May 13, 1913, by an act of the Michigan Legislature; at the time, none of the system's divisions corresponded to the modern I-69 either. In 1919, the Michigan State Highway Department (MSHD) was required to signpost the highway system for the first time, and the state became the second after Wisconsin to do so. At the time, two different highways followed sections of the modern I-69 corridor. The original M-29 ran from the Indiana state line north to Charlotte and turned northeasterly to Lansing. The second highway was M-21 from Flint east to Goodells, a community west of Port Huron; the highway was extended to Port Huron by 1924.

On November 11, 1926, the United States Numbered Highway System was approved by the American Association of State Highway Officials (AASHO), and the new US 27 replaced M-29 from the state line northward to Lansing. By the end of the next year, M-78 was extended from Charlotte north and east of Lansing to a junction with M-47 near Pittsburg, north of the modern I-69. The section of M-78 north of Lansing was changed in 1929; the segment from Dewitt to Pittsburg was redesignated M-104, and M-78 was rerouted along a more southerly path through East Lansing to Haslett. By 1936, M-78 was extended from Haslett all the way into Flint to end at M-21. The first span of the Blue Water Bridge opened between Port Huron and Point Edward, Ontario, in 1938.

Interstate Highway era

The first planning maps from 1947 for what later became the Interstate Highway System did not include a highway along I-69's route; instead a highway further west connecting South Bend, Indiana, with Kalamazoo was included. This alternative highway was maintained on the 1955 plan for the "National System of Interstate and Defense Highways", and numbered I-67 in August 1957. By June 1958, this freeway had been shifted further east and renumbered I-69, connecting Indianapolis, Indiana, with Marshall; no connections north and east to Lansing, Flint or Port Huron were planned as part of the Interstate Highway System. Around the same time, a section of M-146 near Port Huron was converted into an approach freeway for the Blue Water Bridge.

By the middle of 1960, the first section of freeway along M-78 was opened in the Lennon area. The next year, the freeway had been extended as far southwest as Durand from the end at Lennon. Also in 1961, the MSHD had proposed that the section of US 27 south of Lansing be built as an electronic highway under a bid through General Motors; the testing for such a roadway was ultimately done at Ohio State University instead.

By the start of 1962, M-78 was a freeway from Perry at the junction with M-47 all the way to Swartz Creek near Flint. On December 12, 1962, I-96 was completed around the Lansing area, and M-78 was rerouted to follow it. A year later, I-496 was partially opened through the Lansing area, and M-78 was routed to follow it as well; the former route through downtown was redesignated Business M-78 (Bus. M-78). Around the same time, I-94 was extended along the Blue Water Bridge approach freeway.

The first freeway segment of M-21 on the east end was built from Wadhams to Port Huron in 1966. The next year, M-78's freeway was extended eastward to I-75/US 10/US 23 in Flint. On October 11, 1967, the first segment of I-69/US 27 was scheduled to open between the Indiana state line and Tekonsha. By the end of the year, the freeway extended north to I-94 northwest of Marshall. The MSHD requested additional Interstate Highway mileage in 1968 under the Federal-Aid Highway Act of 1968 including an extension of I-69 from Marshall to Port Huron; this extension was approved as far as I-75/US 23 in Flint on December 13, 1968.

A discontinuous section of M-78 freeway east of Flint was completed in 1969. The same year, I-475 was named the David Dunbar Buick Freeway, after the founder of Buick Motor Company in Flint; the same legislation, House Concurrent Resolution 22 of 1969 named the M-78 freeway through Flint for Louis Chevrolet. In 1970, the I-496 freeway was completed and the Bus. M-78 designation was removed through Lansing. A freeway segment between Flint and Lapeer opened in 1971. M-21 was routed down M-13 to the new freeway where it joined the M-78 designation from M-13 east. The section of M-21 formerly between M-13 and Bus. M-54 was redesignated M-56. The M-78 designation was replaced by I-69 in 1973 after a Temporary I-69 (Temp. I-69) designation was extended northward from Charlotte through Lansing to Perry. On September 4 of that year, I-69's designation was officially extended by Congress to end at I-475 on the east side of Flint; this extension, and all subsequent ones, was of non-chargeable mileage, or segments not financed through the Interstate Highway fund.

In 1980, a Flint-area politician wanted to dedicate a highway after the United Auto Workers (UAW). As a result, the David Dunbar Buick Freeway name was moved off I-475 and applied to I-69 in Flint. The American Association of State Highway and Transportation Officials (AASHTO) approved the extension of the I-69 designation eastward in 1983 so it would terminate at the international boundary at Port Huron; this approval was contingent on construction of the roadway to Interstate Highway standards and other appropriate approvals at the federal government level. The remaining segment of freeway connecting Lapeer with Wadhams opened in 1984 as I-69 and several additional changes were made to the highway system at the same time. M-21 was shortened to Flint and replaced M-56 through the city. The former route of M-21 in Port Huron became BL I-69, and the remainder of that highway was turned back to local control. The I-69 designation was officially extended once more under Congressional legislation on February 10, 1987; this last extension designated I-69 all the way to I-94 in Port Huron to reflect the 1984 openings.

Another segment of freeway opened in 1987 in Clinton County between US 127 near DeWitt and Temp. I-69 near Bath. This section was connected to the existing freeway at Perry in 1991. The final segment of I-69 to be completed was located southwest of Lansing. It opened on October 17, 1992, when the ribbon was cut by Governor John Engler. This segment marked the last in the state to complete Michigan's portion of the Interstate Highway System. At the time it was completed, I-69 was concurrent with US 27 from the state line north to the DeWitt area (exit 87) and then concurrent with US 127 to exit 89 before running alone to Port Huron.

Since completion
A second span of the Blue Water Bridge between Port Huron and Point Edward opened in July 1997. The next year, MDOT petitioned AASHTO to decommission the US 27 designation in the state; the change was approved on April 16, 1999. The state waited until 2002 to make the change.

On July 23, 2001, the Michigan Legislature declared that I-69 from exit 105 in Shiawassee County east to exit 135 in Genesee County would be named the Pearl Harbor Memorial Highway. In October 2001, the legislature consolidated the various legislation that created memorial highway designations in the state. Public Act 142 of 2001 extended the merged Chevrolet–Buick Freeway name to all of I-69 in Genesee County, and restored the David Dunbar Buick Freeway name to I-475. The I-69 Recreational Heritage Route (now a Pure Michigan Byway) was created on October 8, 2004, to follow the freeway in Branch and Calhoun counties. The Branch County segment was also dedicated as the Purple Heart Trail on July 17, 2006.

In 2011, construction began to widen I-94/I-69 approaching the Blue Water Bridge, a project completed in 2012. The widening project added dedicated lanes for local traffic and for Blue Water Bridge traffic with a new permanent welcome center opened in 2015, replacing the temporary one near Capac. The lane configuration changes have confused drivers in the area, especially those with outdated GPS devices, a problem first noted as the department was preparing to reopen the freeway in October 2012. As a result, MDOT installed updated signs complete with American and Canadian flags to help prevent drivers from heading to Canada by mistake.

In late 2013, construction began to reconstruct and reconfigure the I-94/I-69 interchange near Port Huron. The project will improve  of freeway, replace several bridges and ramps and cost $76 million. In June 2014, MDOT closed the ramps from I-69 eastbound to BL I-69 through the interchange until later in the year. The project was completed in September 2015.

Exit list

Business loops

In Michigan, I-69 currently has four business loops. These highways, each designated Business Loop I-69 (BL I-69), provide access from the main freeway through the downtown districts of adjacent cities. They follow former routings used by I-69's predecessor highways (US 27, M-78 and M-21) as well as connecting roads. The cities served by these loops are: Coldwater, Charlotte, Lansing, and Port Huron.

See also

Notes

References

External links

 
 I-69 at Michigan Highways

 I-69 Recreational Heritage Route (Southwestern Michigan Planning Commission)

 Michigan
69
Transportation in Branch County, Michigan
Transportation in Calhoun County, Michigan
Transportation in Eaton County, Michigan
Transportation in Clinton County, Michigan
Transportation in Shiawassee County, Michigan
Transportation in Genesee County, Michigan
Transportation in Lapeer County, Michigan
Transportation in St. Clair County, Michigan